The Slough Borough Council election was held on 1 May 1997, at the same time as other local elections across England and Northern Ireland, and on the same day as the general election. All of the 41 seats on Slough Borough Council were up for election, rather than the usual third of the seats. This was in preparation for the local government reorganisation in Berkshire which saw Berkshire County Council abolished and its functions transferred to the six district councils, including Slough, with effect from 1 April 1998. The elections to Berkshire County Council which would ordinarily have been held in 1997 were cancelled.

The election left Labour with a large majority on the council, taking 34 of the council's 41 seats.

Results
The elected councillors were:

Notes:
 (a) Rogers: Formerly served as a councillor 1983–1990
 (b) Mansell: Formerly served as a councillor 1983–1987
 (c) Stokes: Formerly served as a Labour councillor 1983–1986
 (d) Long: Formerly served as a councillor 1976–1995
 (e) Connolly: Formerly served as a councillor 1972–1976

Changes 1997–1999

Notes:-
 * Member of the Britwellian, Independent, Liberal and Liberal Democrat Group (BILLD) after the 2000 election.
 (a) Hewitt: Elected 7 December 1997 to fill a vacancy caused by the resignation of Mrs B.L. Lopez (Lab). Formerly served as a councillor 1975–1979 and 1984–1995.
 (b) Long: Elected 4 February 1999 to fill a vacancy caused by the death of M.G. Long (C). Formerly served as a councillor 1983–1990.

By-election results

By-election cased by the resignation of Mrs B. L. Lopez (Labour).

By-election cased by the death of M. G. Long (Conservative).

References

Slough
1997 English local elections
1997